Jonas Thomsen (born 5 February 1991) is a Danish footballer who currently is a player-manager for Svebølle B&I.

Career

Holbæk B&I

Thomsen got his debut for the first team, at the age of 16. In a period, he trained with FC Midtjylland, but they didn't get to any agreement, because they seemed he was to thin.

Silkeborg IF

Thomsen transferred to Silkeborg IF in 2009 on a two-year contract, where he basically was going to play for the under-19 team. He was 17 years old at this time.

After joining his new club, he also joined the Silkeborg Sports College. As the time went, he also played matches for the reserve team.

FC Vestsjælland

On 15 December 2012, he signed a 2,5-year contract with FC Vestsjælland, who also was his first professional contract.

Loan to HB Køge

On 6 January 2015, Thomsen joined HB Køge on a loan deal until the summer.

Kalundborg G&B
In the summer 2015, Thomsen returned to his child-club Kalundborg G&B.

Holbæk B&I
Thomsen joined Holbæk B&I in the summer 2016.

References

External links
 Jonas Thomsen on Soccerway

1991 births
Living people
Danish men's footballers
Danish Superliga players
Danish 1st Division players
Silkeborg IF players
Association football central defenders
Holbæk B&I players
FC Vestsjælland players
HB Køge players